Bathytoma visagei is a species of sea snail, a marine gastropod mollusk in the family Borsoniidae.

Description
The length of the shell varies between 60 mm and 75 mm.

Distribution
This species occurs in the Indian Ocean off Mozambique and KwaZuluNatal, South Africa.

References

 Kilburn R.N. (1973). Notes on some benthic Mollusca from Natal and Moçambique with descriptions of new species and subspecies of Calliostoma, Solariella, Latiaxis, Babylonia, Fusinus, Bathytoma and Conus. Annals of the Natal Museum. 21(3): 557-578.

External links
 

visagei